The Paneless Window Washer (originally titled as Popeye the Sailor in "The Paneles Window Washer) is a 1937 Popeye theatrical cartoon short in the Max Fleischer Cartoon series directed by Dave Fleischer.

Plot 
Bluto is trying to make a buck by spraying mud on the windows to make people think they're dirty. Up 20 stories (or at least Popeye says that) is Olive Oyl, public stenographer. Wiping all kinds of windows, Popeye and Bluto get into a bitter quarrel between who's better at cleaning windows.

Cast 
Jack Mercer as Popeye
Mae Questel as Olive Oyl
Gus Wickie as Bluto

Production notes 
A version of this film was released by Cartoon Renewal Studios in 2021, enhanced by an artificial intelligence system, colorized and upscaled to 1080 HD.

References

External links 

1937 short films
1937 animated films
1937 comedy films
1930s English-language films
American black-and-white films
Popeye the Sailor theatrical cartoons
1930s American animated films
Paramount Pictures short films
Fleischer Studios short films
Short films directed by Dave Fleischer
American comedy short films
American animated short films